Amy Martin may refer to:

 Amy Jo Martin (born 1969), American microblogger
 Amy Martin (rower) (born 1974), American rower